Sandy & Papo MC, Sandy MC & MC Papo or simply Sandy & Papo, was a duo of merengue and hip hop, with temporary residence in Venezuela. It was made by Sandy Carriello "Sandy MC" and Luis Deschamps "MC Papo", both from the Dominican Republic. The duo was created by Nelson Zapata and Pavel de Jesus, after attending an audition for Proyecto Uno.

The group was part of the merenhouse (called also house-merengue or merengue-hip hop) style movement that emerged in New York City in the 1990s. The pair fused these genres with other dance music ones. Groups such as Proyecto Uno, Fulanito, Ilegales and El Cartel were part of this movement.

Sandy & Papo performed a version of the popular house hit "El Mueve Mueve" ("I Like to Move It" by Reel 2 Real). They created the song "Huelepega", which served to promote the Venezuelan 1999 film of the same name, directed by Elia Schneider.

The group came to an end when on July 11, 1999, when Luis Deschamps (MC Papo) died in a car accident. Sandy MC continued as a solo and received success with the song "Homenaje a Papo". Sandy MC died on December 23, 2020, due to heart attack.

Soundtracks
In 2006, the Australian film, Happy Feet, included parts of the song "Candela" from Sandy MC & MC Papo.

Discography

Sandy MC & MC Papo albums
 1995: Sandy & Papo MC
 1997: Otra Vez
 1998: The Remix Album

Sandy MC solo albums
 2000: Homenaje a Papo
 2005: El Duro Soy Yo
 2011: Insuperable

References

Dominican Republic musical groups
Merengue music groups
Musical groups established in 1995
Musical groups disestablished in 1999